The Chilliwack Chiefs are a junior "A" ice hockey team based in Chilliwack, British Columbia, Canada. They are members of the Mainland Division of the British Columbia Hockey League (BCHL). They play their home games at Chilliwack Coliseum which was vacated after the Chilliwack Bruins of the Western Hockey League (WHL) were sold and moved to Victoria, where they became known as the Victoria Royals.

History

The franchise, originally the Quesnel Millionaires, started out in the Peace Cariboo Junior Hockey League (PCJHL) in 1975. The Millionaires are the 1977, 1978, 1979, and 1987 PCJHL Champions. They also won the 1977, 1978, and 1979 Cyclone Taylor Cup Championships.  In 1996, the Millionaires moved to the British Columbia Hockey League (BCHL).

On May 9, 2011, the BCHL approved the sale of the Millionaires to the Chiefs Development Group in Chilliwack.  The former Chiefs franchise was renamed the Langley Rivermen in preparation for the Millionaires' move to Chilliwack to become the Chiefs.

On May 20, 2018, the Chiefs won their first RBC Cup, 4–2 over the Wellington Dukes while hosting the tournament.

Season-by-season record
Note: GP = Games Played, W = Wins, L = Losses, T = Ties, OTL = Overtime Losses, GF = Goals for, GA = Goals against, Pts = Points

Western Canada Cup
Western Canada Championships: BCHL – AJHL – SJHL – MJHL – HostRound-robin play with 1st vs. 2nd - winner advance to National Championship & loser to runner-up game3rd vs. 4th in 2nd semifinal winner to runner-up game loser eliminated.Runner-up game determines 2nd representative to National Championship.WCC competition began after the 2013 season.

RBC Cup
Canadian Jr. A National ChampionshipsDudley Hewitt Champions – Central, Fred Page Champions – Eastern, Doyle Cup Champion – Pacific, ANAVET Cup Champion – Western, and HostRound-robin play with top four in semifinal games and winners to finals.

See also
List of ice hockey teams in British Columbia

References

External links
Chilliwack Chiefs official website

British Columbia Hockey League teams
Ice hockey teams in British Columbia
Sport in Chilliwack
2011 establishments in British Columbia
Ice hockey clubs established in 2011